The 2014 United States House of Representatives elections in Arkansas was held on Tuesday, November 4, 2014 to elect the four U.S. representatives from the state of Arkansas, one from each of the state's four congressional districts. The elections coincided with the elections of other federal and state offices, including the governor of Arkansas and a United States senator.

Overview 
The table below shows the total number and percentage of votes, as well as the number of seats gained and lost by each political party in the election for the United States House of Representatives in Arkansas.

By district
Results of the 2014 United States House of Representatives elections in Arkansas by district:

District 1

Republican incumbent Rick Crawford has represented the 1st district since 2011. Crawford was elected to a second term in 2012, defeating Democratic prosecutor Scott Ellington, with 56% of the vote.

Democrats hoped to find a strong challenger for the incumbent.

Republican primary

Candidates

Nominee
 Rick Crawford, incumbent U.S. Representative

Declined
 Linda Collins-Smith, former state representative (ran for the state senate)

Democratic primary

Candidates

Nominee
 Jackie McPherson, Mayor of Heber Springs

Declined
 Glen Fenter, president of Mid-South Community College
 Keith Ingram, State Senator
 Joe Jett, State Representative
 Dustin McDaniel, Arkansas Attorney General
 Harold Perrin, Mayor of Jonesboro
 Ben Ponder, candidate for AR-01 in 2010
 Chris Thyer, United States Attorney for the Eastern District of Arkansas
 Zac White, attorney
 Marshall Wright, state representative

Libertarian nomination

Candidates

Nominee
 Brian Scott Willhite

General election

Endorsements

Polling

Results

District 2

Republican Tim Griffin has represented the 2nd District since 2011. Griffin was elected to a second term in 2012, defeating Democratic former state representative Herb Rule, with 55% of the vote. Griffin announced in October 2013 that he would not run for re-election in 2014. In January 2014, he announced he was running for Lieutenant Governor of Arkansas.

Republican primary

Candidates

Nominee
 French Hill, businessman and former White House aide for President George H. W. Bush

Eliminated in primary
 Ann Clemmer, state representative
 Conrad Reynolds, retired U.S. Army Colonel and candidate for Senate in 2010

Declined
 Gilbert Baker, former state senator and candidate for U.S. Senate in 2010
 Jonathan Dismang, state senator
 Lanny Fite, Saline County Judge
 Ed Garner, former state representative
 Tim Griffin, incumbent U.S. Representative
 Jeremy Hutchinson, state senator
 Allen Kerr, state representative
 Andy Mayberry, state representative
 Jason Rapert, state senator
 David J. Sanders, state senator

Polling

Results

Democratic primary

Candidates

Nominee
 Pat Hays, former mayor of North Little Rock

Declined
 Will Bond, former chair of the Democratic Party of Arkansas
 Shane Broadway, interim director of the Arkansas Department of Higher Education and former state senator
 Dianne Curry, former Little Rock School Board President
 John Charles Edwards, state representative
 Bill Halter, former Lieutenant Governor of Arkansas and candidate for U.S. Senate in 2010
 David Johnson, state senator
 Chris Massingill, chairman of the Delta Regional Authority
 Franklin McLarty, businessman and former chair of the Arkansas Economic Development Commission
 Tommy Thompson, state representative
 Tab Townsell, Mayor of Conway
 Linda Tyler, businesswoman and former state representative

Libertarian nomination

Candidates

Nominee
 Debbie Standiford

General election

Endorsements

Polling

Predictions

Results

District 3

Republican incumbent Steve Womack has represented the 3rd district since 2011. Womack was elected to a second term in 2012 with 76% of the vote. Unlike the other Arkansas congressional districts, the 3rd has long had a Republican Congressman.

Republican primary

Candidates

Nominee
Steve Womack, incumbent U.S. Representative

Declined
Thomas Brewer, maths teacher and minister

Democratic primary

Candidates

Declined
Troy Gittings, high school English teacher and stand-up comedian

Libertarian nomination

Candidates

Nominee
Grant Brand

General election

Endorsements

Polling

Results

District 4

Republican Tom Cotton was elected to represent the 4th district in 2012, winning an open seat contest against Democratic State Senator Gene Jeffress with 59%. Cotton has announced he will not run for election to a second term so that he can challenge Democratic incumbent Mark Pryor for his U.S. Senate seat.

Republican primary

Candidates

Nominee
 Bruce Westerman, Majority Leader of the Arkansas House of Representatives

Eliminated in primary
 Tommy Moll, businessman

Withdrawn
 Mark Darr, Lieutenant Governor of Arkansas

Declined
 Nate Bell, state representative
 Tom Cotton, incumbent U.S. Representative
 Lane Jean, state representative
 Beth Anne Rankin, music teacher, former Miss Arkansas, nominee for this seat in 2010 and candidate in 2012
 Matthew Shepherd, state representative

Endorsements

Polling

Results

Democratic primary

Candidates

Nominee
 James Lee Witt, former director of the Federal Emergency Management Agency

Withdrawn
 Janice Percefull, college instructor and author (running as write-in)

Declined
 Conner Eldridge, United States Attorney for the Western District of Arkansas
 Bruce Maloch, state senator
 Bobby Pierce, state senator
 Leslee Milam Post, former state representative
 Chris Thomason, chancellor of the University of Arkansas Community College at Hope and former state representative
 Jeff Wardlaw, state representative

Libertarian nomination

Candidates

Nominee
 Ken Hamilton

General election

Endorsements

Polling

Predictions

Results

See also
 2014 United States House of Representatives elections
 2014 United States elections

References

External links
 U.S. House elections in Arkansas, 2014 at Ballotpedia
 Campaign contributions at OpenSecrets

Arkansas
2014
United States House of Representatives